Quincy's Home Again is an album by Quincy Jones with performances by Harry Arnold's Orchestra. The album was recorded in Sweden in 1958 and released by Metronome label. The album was also released in the U.S. as Harry Arnold + Big Band + Quincy Jones = Jazz! by EmArcy.

Reception

AllMusic gave the album four stars, calling it "an excellent effort featuring a hard-swinging Swedish band that deserved to be better known in the U.S".

Track listing
All compositions by Harry Arnold, except as indicated.
 "Quincy's Home Again" – 2:28
 "The Midnight Sun Never Sets" (Jones, Dorcas Cochran, Henri Salvador) – 4:07
 "Cherokee" (Ray Noble) – 3:14
 "Count 'Em" (Jones, Jimmy Cleveland) – 5:30
 "Brief Encounter" – 3:04
 "Room 608" (Horace Silver) – 3:14
 "Kinda Blues" – 6:00
 "Meet Benny Bailey" (Jones) - 3:50
 "Doodlin'" (Silver) – 5:13

Personnel
 Quincy Jones – arranger
 Harry Arnold – director
 Benny Bailey – trumpet
 Sixten Eriksson – trumpet
 Arnold Johansson – trumpet
 Weine Renliden – trumpet
 Bengt-Arne Wallin – trumpet
 Gordon Ohlsson – trombone
 Åke Persson – trombone
 Andreas Skjold – trombone
 Georg Vernon – trombone
 Rolf Backman – alto saxophone
 Arne Domnérus – alto saxophone
 Rolf Blomquist – tenor saxophone, flute
 Bjarne Nerem – tenor saxophone
 Carl-Henrik Norin – tenor saxophone
 Johnny Ekh – baritone saxophone
 Rune Falk – baritone saxophone
 Bengt Hallberg – piano
 Rolf Berg – guitar
 Simon Brehm– bass
 Lars Pettersson – bass
 Egil Johansen – drums

References

1958 albums
Mercury Records albums
Quincy Jones albums
Albums arranged by Quincy Jones